Anisetti Raghuvir (22 March 1929 – 21 July 2007) was a Hyderabad High Court Judge. He was later the Chief Justice of the Gauhati High Court. He was also the  Governor of Assam.

References

Governors of Assam
Chief Justices of the Gauhati High Court
Judges of the Andhra Pradesh High Court
1929 births
2007 deaths